(85182) 1991 AQ, provisional designation , is a stony asteroid on a highly eccentric orbit, classified as near-Earth object and potentially hazardous asteroid of the Apollo group, approximately  in diameter. It was discovered on 14 January 1991, by American astronomer Eleanor Helin at the Palomar Observatory in California. Based on its brightness variation of 0.69 magnitude, this Q-type asteroid is likely elongated. It belongs to the small group of potentially hazardous asteroids larger than one kilometer.

Orbit and classification 

 is a member of the Earth-crossing class of Apollo asteroids, the largest group of near-Earth objects with approximately 10 thousand known members. It is also a Venus- and Mars-crosser due to its extreme perihelion and aphelion, respectively.

It orbits the Sun at a distance of 0.5–3.9 AU once every 3 years and 4 months (1,210 days; semi-major axis of 2.22 AU). Its orbit has a high eccentricity of 0.78 and an inclination of 3° with respect to the ecliptic. The body's observation arc begins with its official discovery observation at Palomar in 1991.

Close approaches 

The asteroids closest encounter with Earth is projected to occur on 27 January 2130, at a distance of  only (see table). It also makes close encounters to Mercury, Venus, Mars and Jupiter.

Physical characteristics 

In the Tholen classification, this object is an uncommon Q-type asteroid, that falls into the larger stony S-complex. As of 2018, no rotational lightcurve of this asteroid has been obtained from photometric observations. The body's rotation period, pole and shape remain unknown. It has a brightness variation of 0.69 magnitude, indicative for an elongated, non-spherical shape.

Diameter and albedo 

According to the survey carried out by the NEOWISE mission of NASA's Wide-field Infrared Survey Explorer, this asteroid measures 1.1 kilometers in diameter and its surface has an albedo of 0.242. The Collaborative Asteroid Lightcurve Link assumes an albedo of 0.18 and derives a diameter of 1.14 kilometers based on an absolute magnitude of 17.20.

Numbering and naming 

This minor planet was numbered by the Minor Planet Center on 30 August 2004. As of 2018, it has not been named.

References

External links 
 List of the Potentially Hazardous Asteroids (PHAs), Minor Planet Center
 PHA Close Approaches To The Earth, Minor Planet Center
 Asteroid Lightcurve Database (LCDB), query form (info )
 Asteroids and comets rotation curves, CdR – Observatoire de Genève, Raoul Behrend
 
 
 

085182
Discoveries by Eleanor F. Helin
085182
19910114